seaQuest DSV is an American science fiction television series.

seaQuest, SeaQuest, Sea Quest, or Seaquest may also refer to:
 seaQuest DSV (video game), a 1994/1995 game based on the TV series
 Sea Quest, a semi-submersible oil platform
 Fermilab E-906/SeaQuest, a fixed target experiment at the Fermi National Accelerator Laboratory
 Seaquest (video game), an unrelated Atari 2600 game released in 1982
 Seaquest State Park, a state park located in the northwest US state of Washington 
 SeaQuest, a brand of diving equipment affiliated with Aqua Lung International
 Sea Quest (novel series), a series of fantasy novels for children
 SeaQuest Interactive Aquariums, a U.S. chain of retail-mall-based aquaria.